Gerrard may refer to:

People
 Alfred Horace Gerrard (1899–1998), English sculptor
 Anthony Gerrard (born 1986), English footballer
 Edward Gerrard (footballer) (1900–1987), English footballer
 James Joseph Gerrard, (1897–1991), American Roman Catholic bishop
 Liam Gerrard, British-Irish actor
 Lisa Gerrard (born 1961), Australian singer and composer
 Marguerite Primrose Gerrard (1922–1993), Jamaican-born American artist
 Mark Gerrard (born 1982), Australian rugby player
 Paul Gerrard (born 1973), English goalkeeper
 Sophie Gerrard (born 1978), Scottish photographer
 Steven Gerrard (born 1980), English football manager and former player
 William Tyrer Gerrard (1831–1866), English botanist and plant collector

Places
 Gerrards Cross, a village in Buckinghamshire
 Gerrard, Colorado, Rio Grande County, Colorado
 Gerrard, British Columbia, a ghost town

See also
 Gerrard Street (disambiguation), a street name in two cities
 Gerrards Cross, Buckinghamshire, England
 
 Gerard, a name